The superior suprarenal artery is an artery in the abdomen. It is a branch of the inferior phrenic artery, itself a branch of the aorta. It supplies the adrenal gland.

Structure 
The superior suprarenal artery is a branch of the inferior phrenic artery. There may be multiple branches, each of which is fairly small. The inferior phrenic artery is itself is a branch of the aorta. The phrenic artery supplies the diaphragm.

Function 
The superior suprarenal artery supplies the adrenal gland. It may be more important during prenatal development.

Clinical significance 
The superior suprarenal artery may be assessed using Doppler ultrasound.

History 
The superior suprarenal artery may also be known as the superior adrenal artery.

See also 
 Middle suprarenal arteries
 Inferior suprarenal artery

References

External links 
  - "The suprarental glands. Blood supply to the suprarenal glands."

Arteries of the abdomen
Adrenal gland